Shovel Creek is a stream in the U.S. states of Oregon and Washington. It is a tributary of the Snake River.

Shovel Creek was named for the fact prospectors had dug for gold along the stream.

See also
List of rivers of Washington

References

Rivers of Asotin County, Washington
Rivers of Wallowa County, Oregon
Rivers of Oregon
Rivers of Washington (state)